Frescobaldi is an editor for LilyPond music files. It aims to be powerful, yet lightweight and easy to use. Frescobaldi is free software, freely available under the GNU General Public License. It is designed to run on all major operating systems (Linux, Mac OS X and Microsoft Windows). It is named after Girolamo Frescobaldi, an Italian composer of keyboard music in the late Renaissance and early Baroque period.

Frescobaldi is written in Python and uses PyQt for its user interface.

Features
 Text editor with syntax highlighting and automatic completion
 Music view 
 MIDI player to proof-listen LilyPond-generated MIDI files
 Wizard to quickly set up a new score
 Snippet Manager to store and apply text snippets, templates or scripts
 Use multiple versions of LilyPond, automatically selects the correct version
 Built-in LilyPond documentation browser and built-in help
 Configurable colors, fonts and keyboard shortcuts
 Translated into the following languages: Dutch, English, French, German, Italian, Czech, Russian, Spanish, Galician, Turkish and Polish

Music functions
 Transpose music
 Change music from relative to absolute and vice versa
 Change the language used for note names
 Change the rhythm (double, halve, add/remove dots, copy, paste) etc.
 Hyphenate lyrics using word-processor hyphenation dictionaries
 Add spanners, dynamics, articulations
 Update LilyPond syntax using convert-ly, with display of differences

See also
 List of music software
 LilyPond

References

External links

 

LilyPond
Scorewriters
Free music software
Audio software that uses Qt
Free software programmed in Python
Scorewriters for Linux